Cumrun Vafa (born 1 August 1960) is an Iranian-American theoretical physicist and the Hollis Professor of Mathematics and Natural Philosophy at Harvard University.

Early life and education
Cumrun Vafa was born in Tehran, Iran on 1 August 1960. He became interested in physics as a young child, specifically how the moon was not falling from the sky, and he later grew his interests in math by high school and was fascinated by how mathematics could predict the movement of objects.

He graduated from Alborz High School in Tehran and moved to the United States in 1977 for study at university. He received a B.S. in mathematics and physics from the Massachusetts Institute of Technology (MIT) in 1981. He received his Ph.D. in physics from Princeton University in 1985 after completing a doctoral dissertation, titled "Symmetries, inequalities and index theorems", under the supervision of Edward Witten.

Academia 
After his PhD degree, Vafa became a junior fellow via the Harvard Society of Fellows at Harvard University, where he later got a junior faculty position. In 1989 he was offered a senior faculty position, and he has been there ever since.

Vafa worked at Princeton University within the Institute for Advanced Study, within the School of Natural Sciences and the School of Mathematics in 1994.

Research
Vafa's research is primarily in string theory, and is focused on the nature of quantum gravity and the relation between geometry and quantum field theories. He is known in the string theory community for his co-discovery with Strominger that the Bekenstein-Hawking entropy of a black hole can be accounted for by solitonic states of superstring theory, and for expounding the relation between geometry and field theories that arise through string dualities (culminating in the Gopakumar–Vafa conjecture). This topic has been known as "geometric engineering of quantum field theories".

In 1997, he developed F-theory, a 12-dimensional theory that compactifies to 10-D Type IIB superstring theory.

He is also interested in understanding the underlying meaning of string dualities, as well as trying to apply superstring theory to some unsolved questions of elementary particle physics such as the hierarchy problem and the cosmological constant problem.

He has made contributions to topological string theories and to the understanding of mirror symmetry.

He is a trustee of Network of Iranians for Knowledge and Innovation (NIKI).

Awards and honors 
In 2017, Vafa, alongside Andrew Strominger and Joseph Polchinski, jointly won the Breakthrough Prize in Fundamental Physics for their advancement of string theory and jointly won the 2014 Breakthrough Prize in Physics Frontiers Prize.

He is the recipient of the Abdus Salam International Centre for Theoretical Physics (ICTP)'s, 2008 Dirac Medal, which was won alongside Juan Maldacena, and Joseph Polchinski for their advancement of string theory.

In 1998 he was a Plenary Speaker at the International Congress of Mathematicians.

In 2016, Vafa was awarded the Dannie Heineman Prize for Mathematical Physics.

Vafa was elected as a member of the American Academy of Arts and Sciences in 2005 and as a member of the National Academy of Sciences in 2009.

In 2021, Vafa was awarded the Mustafa Prize.

Publications

Research articles 
Vafa has co-authored and published more than 300 research articles in the fields of string theory, mathematics, and physics, with many other researchers including: Robbert Dijkgraaf, Hirosi Ooguri, Mina Aganagic, Sergei Gukov, Rajesh Gopakumar, Lotte Hollands, and many others. This is a select list of these works:

 
 

Dixon, L; Harvey, JA; Vafa, C; Witten, E. "Strings on orbifolds" . Nuclear Physics.

Books

References

External links 

 Harvard University faculty webpage 
 Video: Cumrun Vafa: 2017 Breakthrough Prize Laureate Interview (2018) via YouTube
 Video: Cumrun Vafa: String Theory. Lex Fridman Podcast #204 (2021) via YouTube

1960 births
Alborz High School alumni
21st-century American physicists
Harvard University faculty
Iranian physicists
American people of Iranian descent
Massachusetts Institute of Technology School of Science alumni
Princeton University alumni
American string theorists
Fellows of the American Physical Society
Theoretical physicists
Living people
Iranian expatriate academics
People from Tehran
MIT Department of Physics alumni